The men's 78 kg competition in judo at the 1988 Summer Olympics in Seoul was held on 28 September at the Jangchung Gymnasium. The gold medal was won by Waldemar Legień of Poland.

Results

Pool A

Pool B

Repechages

Final

Final classification

References

Judo at the 1988 Summer Olympics
Judo at the Summer Olympics Men's Half Middleweight
Men's events at the 1988 Summer Olympics